Message in a Bottle is a 1999 American romantic drama film directed by Luis Mandoki and based on Nicholas Sparks' 1998 novel of the same name. It stars Kevin Costner, Robin Wright (under her married name Robin Wright Penn) and Paul Newman, and was filmed in Maine, Chicago and Wilmington, North Carolina. The film was released on February 12, 1999 by Warner Bros. Pictures. The film was panned by the critics but was a big box office hit grossing $118 million against a $30 million budget.

Plot

Theresa Osborne, a former reporter, works as a researcher for the Chicago Tribune. On a trip to Cape Cod, she finds a mysterious, intriguing and typed love letter in a bottle in the sand, addressed to Catherine. She is fascinated by it and shows it to her colleagues. They print it in their newspaper without Theresa's knowledge and receive a multitude of responses. 

One of the letters contains an attached letter which was addressed to the same person, on the same letterhead and typed in the same tone. Later, they receive another letter of the same kind from one of the readers which was not addressed to Catherine, but typed on the same notepad. Eventually, they track the author down with the help of the typewriter and the letterhead used. His name is Garrett Blake, and he lives quietly on the Outer Banks of North Carolina near his father, Dodge.

Theresa goes to Outer Banks to research it further but when she meets him, they are mutually attracted and start becoming better acquainted. She tries to tell him about the original purpose of her visit but fears that she might lose him and postpones it. Along with the literal distance between them — they live hundreds of miles apart — there is another problem: Garrett cannot quite forget Catherine who died, leaving him.

Theresa's career flourishes as the romantic "message in a bottle" tale is told in print, without naming names. Garrett makes a trip to Chicago to visit Theresa and her young son. They seem very happy together for a day, but he finds his letters in her nightstand, becomes upset, and starts to leave. 

When Theresa reveals that there are three letters of the same kind, he becomes intrigued as he only wrote two of them and comes back to see another letter. The third one, which was not addressed to Catherine, was actually written by Catherine; in that letter, she reveals her love, her knowledge of her impending death, and how she was content with her life with Garrett, however short it might be. He leaves with the letter, leaving Theresa in tears.

Garrett moves on with his life and sets things straight with Catherine's family, who had been battling with him for Catherine's artwork. He finishes his own personalized boat with the help of Catherine's brother and names it Catherine in her honor, and sends an invitation to Theresa to visit. 

When Theresa goes there, she witnesses Garrett's passionate speech about Catherine. She understands that he still is in love with his late wife, and leaves him saying that he is welcome to call her when he thinks he is ready to start a new life.

After that night, Garrett writes a letter to Catherine, puts it in a bottle and goes sailing. A storm breaks out and Garrett desperately tries to save a family from a sinking boat and succeeds in saving two out of three; however, in the process, he himself drowns. 

Garrett's father Dodge calls Theresa and informs her about his death. Heartbroken, Theresa goes there to bid farewell; Dodge gives her the letter that Garrett had intended for Catherine, found on his boat. He wrote that he found someone else, Theresa who is as dear as Catherine to him. He decides to start a new life with her, and asks for Catherine's blessing. Though devastated, Theresa comes back contented, stating that though this experience left her in grief, it helped her to feel the most important thing in life.

Cast
 Kevin Costner as Garrett Blake
 Robin Wright as Theresa Osborne
 Paul Newman as Dodge Blake
 Susan Brightbill as Catherine Land Blake
 John Savage as Johnny Land
 Illeana Douglas as Lina Paul
 Robbie Coltrane as Charlie Toschi
 Jesse James as Jason Osborne
 Bethel Leslie as Marta Land
 Tom Aldredge as Hank Land
 Hayden Panettiere as Girl on Boat
 Rosemary Murphy as Helen at the B&B

Production

Filming
The producers originally planned to film on Tangier Island, Virginia, but the Tangier town council voted against allowing it due to the drinking, swearing and sex in the script.

Warner Bros. then tried Martha's Vineyard near Chilmark, Massachusetts, but the Chilmark Conservation Commission turned down a request to build a temporary  house on stilts in the dunes near Chilmark Pond.

Beach scenes were filmed at Popham Beach in Phippsburg, Maine. No filming was done at the Outer Banks (the setting of the novel).

Music
Irish music group Clannad wrote the song "What Will I Do" for the film. Singer Richard Marx also composed the song "One More Time", sung by Laura Pausini, which played during the credits.

Reception

Box office

The film has grossed $52,880,016 in North America and $66,000,000 in other territories for a worldwide total of $118,880,016. In its opening weekend, the film grossed $18,852,976, finishing first at the box office, knocking off Payback from the top box office ($17,719,502).

Critical reception

The film received generally negative reviews from critics. On the review aggregator website Rotten Tomatoes, the film holds a 32% rating, based on 38 reviews, with an average rating of 5.2/10. The site's consensus states: "Handsome-looking but dramatically inert, Message in a Bottle maroons a formidable cast in a trite romance that lacks spark." Metacritic reports a 39 out of 100 rating, based on 23 critics, indicating "generally unfavorable reviews".

Roger Ebert of the Chicago Sun-Times gave the film two out of four stars, praising the lead actors, particularly Newman "steals every scene he's in", but criticized the contrived ending. Todd McCarthy from The Hollywood Reporter called it a "dreary, lachrymose and incredibly poky tear-jerker" but conceded it had a built in audience among those who put the book on the bestseller list.

Accolades

Home media

Message in a Bottle was released on VHS and DVD on August 3, 1999.

See also
 Message in a bottle, about the history, nature and actual examples of bottled messages

References

External links
 
 
 
 
 

1999 films
1990s English-language films
1999 romantic drama films
American romantic drama films
Films scored by Gabriel Yared
Films about widowhood
Films based on works by Nicholas Sparks
Films based on romance novels
Films directed by Luis Mandoki
Films produced by Denise Di Novi
Films set in Chicago
Films set in North Carolina
Films shot in California
Films shot in Maine
Films shot in North Carolina
Warner Bros. films
1990s American films